Jubilee is the third album by the band Ten Shekel Shirt. It was originally released on August 19, 2008 by Rounder Records but after parting ways with the label Jubilee was re-released independently in 2009.

From the Ten Shekel Shirt website: The origin of the word Jubilee has nothing to do with a wedding anniversary or a schmaltzy Las Vegas show. It has everything to do with the emancipation of slaves and the celebration of freedom and justice. When the band's front man Lamont Hiebert wrote the title track, Jubilee, he combined that ancient meaning of the word with the true story of a young girl rescued from slavery and her first moments in a safehome.

Track listing
"Jubilee"
"Surprised"
"Fragile"
"Spark"
"Higher Ground"
"En Garde"
"Wartime Lullaby"
"Love From a lesser god"
"You Rescue"
"Daylight"
"It's Slavery"

2008 albums
Ten Shekel Shirt albums